The Democrats may refer to:
Democratic Party (United States)
The Democrats (Austria)
The Democrats (Benin)
The Democrats (Canada)
The Democrats (Gabon)
The Democrats (Italy)

See also
Democrat (disambiguation)
Democrat Party (disambiguation) 
Democratic Party (disambiguation)